New humanism may refer to
New humanism philosophy by Indian philosopher M. N. Roy. 
German new humanism, or new humanism (Neuhumanismus)
New humanism (literature)
Neohumanism, a holistic philosophical theory given by Prabhat Ranjan Sarkar.

See also
 
 New Humanism (Humanist Movement)
 New Humanist, magazine